Delavan is a city in Faribault County, Minnesota, United States. The population was 179 at the 2010 census.

History
Delavan was platted in 1870 when the railroad was extended to that point, and named for Oren Delavan Brown, a railroad official. A post office was established as Delavan Station in 1870, and the name of the post office was changed to Delavan in 1885. Delavan was incorporated in 1877.

Geography

Minnesota State Highway 109 and County Highway 13 are two of the main routes in the community.

Demographics

2010 census
As of the census of 2010, there were 179 people, 86 households, and 54 families residing in the city. The racial makeup of the city was 96.6% White, 0.6% from other races, and 2.8% from two or more races. Hispanic or Latino of any race were 1.1% of the population.

There were 86 households, of which 22.1% had children under the age of 18 living with them, 47.7% were married couples living together, 10.5% had a female householder with no husband present, 4.7% had a male householder with no wife present, and 37.2% were non-families. 31.4% of all households were made up of individuals, and 15.1% had someone living alone who was 65 years of age or older. The average household size was 2.08 and the average family size was 2.56.

The median age in the city was 53.1 years. 19.6% of residents were under the age of 18; 6.2% were between the ages of 18 and 24; 16.8% were from 25 to 44; 32.4% were from 45 to 64; and 25.1% were 65 years of age or older. The gender makeup of the city was 52.5% male and 47.5% female.

2000 census
As of the census of 2000, there were 223 people, 100 households, and 71 families residing in the city. The racial makeup of the city was 99.55% White and 0.45% African American. Hispanic or Latino of any race were 0.45% of the population.

There were 100 households, out of which 23.0% had children under the age of 18 living with them, 64.0% were married couples living together, 4.0% had a female householder with no husband present, and 29.0% were non-families. 26.0% of all households were made up of individuals, and 19.0% had someone living alone who was 65 years of age or older.  The average household size was 2.23 and the average family size was 2.65.

In the city, the population was spread out, with 17.0% under the age of 18, 7.2% from 18 to 24, 23.3% from 25 to 44, 23.8% from 45 to 64, and 28.7% who were 65 years of age or older.  The median age was 47 years. For every 100 females, there were 104.6 males.  For every 100 females age 18 and over, there were 105.6 males.

The median income for a household in the city was $38,125, and the median income for a family was $40,000. Males had a median income of $29,375 versus $17,083 for females. The per capita income for the city was $18,144.  About 2.9% of families and 4.7% of the population were below the poverty line, including none of those under the age of eighteen and 10.3% of those 65 or over.

Notable people
 Pat Piper, Minnesota state legislator, was born in Delavan.
 Harland G. Wood (1907–1991), biochemist, was  born in Delavan.

References

Cities in Minnesota
Cities in Faribault County, Minnesota